Inversodicraea koukoutamba is a flowering plant in the family Podostemaceae discovered in Guinea, Africa in the Bafing River. The family is known as the 'orchids of the falls' (although not orchids).

References 

Podostemaceae
Taxa named by Martin Cheek